Gennady Andreyevich Sarychev (born 14 December 1938) is a Russian professional football coach and a former player.

External links
 

1938 births
People from Ust-Pristansky District
Living people
Soviet footballers
PFC Krylia Sovetov Samara players
FC Dnipro players
Soviet football managers
Soviet expatriate football managers
Expatriate football managers in Afghanistan
Russian expatriate sportspeople in Afghanistan
Russian football managers
PFC Krylia Sovetov Samara managers
Afghanistan national football team managers
FC Baltika Kaliningrad managers
Association football defenders
FC Sibir Novosibirsk players
Sportspeople from Altai Krai